Marshall Bolds Champlain (December 22, 1824 in Stafford, Genesee County, New York – March 7, 1879 in Cuba, Allegany County, New York) was an American lawyer and politician.

Personal life
Marshall B. Champlain was born in 1824 to Dr. Gilbert B. Champlain. He died of pneumonia in 1879.

Legal career 
He was admitted to the bar in 1843, and practised at Cuba, N.Y. He was District Attorney of Allegany County in 1845.

He was a member of the New York State Assembly (Allegany Co., 2nd D.) in 1853; and was one of the Managers who prosecuted the impeachment of Canal Commissioner John C. Mather. He also successfully prosecuted Edward H. Rulloff for murder.  Another of his cases was against the Erie Railway Company.

Political career 
He was delegate to the 1860 Democratic National Convention at Charleston, South Carolina, and to the 1864 Democratic National Convention at Chicago.

In 1861 and 1863 he was the Democratic candidate for New York State Attorney General, but was defeated by his former fellow Democrats Daniel S. Dickinson and John Cochrane who were nominated by Union conventions of Republicans and War Democrats. In 1867, he finally was elected, and re-elected in 1869, to the office. In 1871 he was defeated when running for re-election.

He was a delegate to the New York State Constitutional Convention of 1867.

Sources
 His obit, in NYT on March 10, 1879 [erroneously stating he was DA of Genesee Co., and stating that he was a descendant of Samuel de Champlain who had no known descendants]
 Political Graveyard
Google Books The New York Civil List compiled by Franklin Benjamin Hough (Weed, Parsons and Co., 1858) [name given on page 264 as Marshall B. Chaplin, on page 370 as Champlin]
Google Books The New York State Register for 1843 edited by O. L. Holley (page 360, J. Disturnell, Albany NY, 1843) [listed as Marshall B. Champlin, Master in Chancery, not DA]
Google Books The New York State Register for 1847 edited by Orville Luther Holley (page 38 and 126, J. Disturnell, New York NY, 1847) [listed as Marshall B. Champlin, attorney at law; Lucien P. Wetherby is DA at this time]
 His nomination, in NYT on September 22, 1861 [name given as Marshal B. Champlin]

References 

1822 births
1879 deaths
New York State Attorneys General
Members of the New York State Assembly
County district attorneys in New York (state)
People from Stafford, New York
19th-century American politicians
Deaths from pneumonia in New York (state)